Giuseppina Nicoli (18 November 1863 – 31 December 1924) was an Italian Roman Catholic religious sister. Nicoli - aged 20 at the time - became a member of the Vincentians and became a catechist in Sardinia where she was positioned for most of her life despite holding several positions of leadership in Turin and elsewhere for a brief period.

Her beatification was started under Pope Paul VI in 1966 and she was later named as Venerable under Pope Benedict XVI in 2006 who also approved her beatification - Cardinal José Saraiva Martins beatified Nicoli in 2008 on the behalf of the pontiff. Her annual liturgical feast was not affixed to the date of her death (as is the norm) but rather on the date of her beatification.

Life
Giuseppina Nicoli was born in Pavia on 18 November 1863 as the fifth of ten children to Carlo Nicoli - a magistrate. Nicoli studied in Pavia and Voghera where she achieved excellent results.

Nicoli became a member of the Vincentians at their San Salvario house in Turin on 24 September 1883. She was vested in the habit in late 1883 while in Paris. On 1 January 1885 her superiors dispatched her to the island of Sardinia where she served the poor and aided her order in a series of social initiatives targeted at the poor and orphaned. She dealt with the victims of a cholera outbreak in 1886. She made her simple vows on 24 December 1888. In June 1899 she became the director of the Sassari orphanage and there taught catechism to the poor and illiterate as well as to the daughters of rich families who had no religious instruction whatsoever. Nicoli encouraged Eucharistic Adoration and she supported the "Associazione dei Figli di Maria" while also serving as the director of the "Associazione delle Figlie di Maria". In 1893 she contracted tuberculosis that remained with her and corroded her health.

In 1910 her superior summoned her to Turin and - until August 1914 - served as the provincial administrator for the order there and was then sent back to Sardinia when her superiors noted her great contributions to the order's presence there. In Turin she also had served as the directress of the order's novitiate from 1912 until a mere nine months after. She also tended to wounded soldiers during World War I. Nicoli also worked alongside the "Monelli di Maria" and got the children that the movement aided to mass and also taught them how to read and write. It was while in Sassari that she became acquainted with Giovanni Battista Manzella.

Nicoli died of bronchial pneumonia at 9:00am on 31 December 1924. Her relations wanted her to be interred next to her parents at Casatisma but the people of Cagliari persuaded the relations to inter Nicoli's remains in the town. In October 1932 her remains were moved into a chapel at the Asilo della Marina in Cagliari.

Beatification
The informative process for beatification commenced in 1930 and concluded its business in 1947 while two separate processes were held in other Italian cities - one in Sassari spanned from 1932 until 1947 while the other in Turin opened in 1934 and closed in 1947 at the same time as the other two processes. Theologians approved her writings to be orthodox on 12 January 1950. The formal introduction of the cause came under Pope Paul VI on 27 January 1966 and she was accorded the title of Servant of God as the first official stage in the process. The Congregation for the Causes of Saints validated these processes in Rome on 27 September 1985 and received the official Positio dossier from the postulation in 1998 for inspection.

Theologians approved the cause on 4 February 2005 as did the C.C.S. on 17 May 2005. On 28 April 2006 she was declared to be Venerable after Pope Benedict XVI confirmed that Nicoli had indeed lived a model life of heroic virtue.

The process for the investigation of the miracle needed for her to be beatified was held in Milan from 1934 until 1936 and was later validated on 28 September 1998 which allowed for a medical board to approve it on 30 June 2005 and theologians to follow suit on 13 June 2006. The C.C.S. also voted in favor of the miracle on 20 March 2007 which led to Benedict XVI approving it on 6 July 2007 thus confirming Nicoli would be beatified. Cardinal José Saraiva Martins presided over the beatification in Cagliari on the pope's behalf. There were 400 priests present in addition to sixteen Sardinian bishops and fourteen Italian mainland bishops. Cardinal Franc Rode was also present as was Prince Emanuele Filiberto of Savoy, Prince of Venice.

The miracle in question involved the cure of Battista Colleoni of severe tuberculosis on 26 December 1933.

The current postulator for this cause is Shijo Kanjirathamkunnel.

References

External links
Hagiography Circle
Saints SQPN

1863 births
1924 deaths
19th-century venerated Christians
19th-century Italian Roman Catholic religious sisters and nuns
20th-century Italian Roman Catholic religious sisters and nuns
20th-century venerated Christians
Beatifications by Pope Benedict XVI
Daughters and Sisters of Charity of St. Vincent de Paul
Deaths from pneumonia in Sardinia
Italian beatified people
Religious leaders from Pavia
Venerated Catholics by Pope Benedict XVI
Vincentian beatified people